Mohamed al-Faki Suleiman (also Alfaki, Elfaki, El Faki; born) is a Sudanese politician who was the youngest member of the Sovereignty Council of Sudan. Under Article 19 of the August 2019 Draft Constitutional Declaration, al-Faki, as is the case for the other members of the Sovereignty Council, is ineligible to run in the election scheduled to follow the 39-month transition to democracy period. The Sovereignty Council was later dissolved in October 2021.

Education
Al-Faki studied political science.

Journalism and political activism
Al-Faki published two novels and a political book, Challenges of Building the State of Sudan.

Sudanese Revolution
According to Radio Dabanga, al-Faki was active in the Unionist Association that was one of the founding coalitions that created the Forces of Freedom and Change (FFC) alliance, the major civilian coordination body during the Sudanese Revolution, in January 2019.

Sovereignty Council
On 21 August 2019, al-Faki became one of the civilian members of the joint civilian–military transitionary head of state of Sudan called the Sovereignty Council of Sudan.

Al-Faki frequently acted as the Sovereignty Council's spokesperson. A week after the formal transfer of power from the Transitional Military Council to the Sovereignty Council, al-Faki commented on a controversy regarding facilities to be provided to the Sovereignty Council members. According to Asharq Al-Awsat, rumours circulated that council members "received Infiniti luxury cars and were offered by the presidential palace authorities to move to first-class hotels until their presidential residences were equipped", which was considered by Sudanese citizens to represent the lavishness of the Omar al-Bashir government. The presidency was estimated to own between 800 and 1000 luxury cars valued together at  billion. Al-Faki responded to the rumour by stating that the cars "are the property of the state, and used in official ceremonies" and that they would not be used by the council members. Asharq Al-Awsat estimates the presidency budget for 2019 at twice the total budget for education and health. Al-Faki stated the appreciation by "the political class" of the criticism.

On 10 October 2019, al-Faki announced the appointment of Nemat Abdullah Khair as Chief Justice of Sudan and Tag el-Sir el-Hibir as Attorney-General.

Arrest and dissolution of Sovereignty Council
On 25 October 2021, Faki was confirmed to have been arrested following a military coup which overthrew the Sudanese government. The same day, the Sovereignty Council of Sudan which Faki served on would be dissolved as well. In April 2022, Mohamed el-Feki Suleiman was released by the Sudanese junta.

References

1970s births
Living people
Members of the Sovereignty Council of Sudan
Sudanese journalists
Sudanese democracy activists